The 2019 LBA Playoffs, officially known as the 2019 LBA Playoff PosteMobile, was the postseason tournament of the 2018–19 LBA season, which began on 7 October 2018. The Playoffs started on May 18, 2019, and finished in June 2019, with the Finals.

AX Armani Exchange Milano were the defending champions.

Umana Reyer Venezia won their 4th title by beating Banco di Sardegna Sassari in game 7 of the finals.

Qualified teams
The eight first qualified teams after the end of the regular season were qualified to the playoffs.

Bracket

Quarterfinals
All times were in Central European Summer Time (UTC+02:00)
The quarterfinals were played in a best of five format.

AX Armani Exchange Milano v Sidigas Avellino

Banco di Sardegna Sassari v New Basket Brindisi

Vanoli Cremona v Alma Pallacanestro Trieste

Umana Reyer Venezia v Dolomiti Energia Trento

Semifinals
All times are in Central European Summer Time (UTC+02:00)
The semifinals are played in a best of five format.

AX Armani Exchange Milano v Banco di Sardegna Sassari

Vanoli Cremona v Umana Reyer Venezia

Finals

All times were in Central European Summer Time (UTC+02:00)
The finals were played in a best of seven format.

Umana Reyer Venezia v Banco di Sardegna Sassari

References

External links
Official website

2018–19 in Italian basketball
LBA Playoffs